Wyoming Highway 296 (WYO 296) also known as the Chief Joseph Scenic Byway is a  state highway in the U.S. state of Wyoming. It follows the route taken by Chief Joseph as he led the Nez Perce out of Yellowstone National Park and into Montana in 1877 during their attempt to flee the U.S. Cavalry and escape into Canada.

Route description

Highway 296 begins its western end at U.S. Route 212 (Beartooth Highway) fourteen miles southeast of Cooke City, Montana. WYO 296 travels southeasterly as it winds through the Shoshone National Forest and through the Absaroka Mountains and then passes through Dead Indian Pass. After almost 46 miles, WYO 296 reaches its eastern end at Wyoming Highway 120, 17 miles north of Cody.

Highway 296 crosses Sunlight Creek Bridge, the highest in Wyoming.

Major intersections

See also

References

External links

 Wyoming State Routes 200-299
 WYO 296 - WYO 120 to US 212
 
 Chief Joseph Scenic Byway - Wyoming Tourism

Transportation in Park County, Wyoming
296
Shoshone National Forest
Geography of Wyoming